Lycia Naff (born August 29, 1962) is an American dancer, actress, and journalist. She is best known as an actress for a two-episode role as Ensign Sonya Gomez on Star Trek: The Next Generation and for an appearance as a three-breasted prostitute in Total Recall. Her journalism career includes early work on the Bill Cosby sexual assault cases story in 2014 with her interview of actress and rape survivor Barbara Bowman.

Biography

Acting
Her acting career began as a dancer in the 1982 television series Fame. Her later roles included a 2007 guest starring role in Without A Trace, Ensign Sonya Gomez on two episodes of Star Trek: The Next Generation a role she would return to in 2021 to voice Captain Sonya Gomez on the animated series Star Trek: Lower Decks, Dixie, a prostitute in the hit 1987 film Lethal Weapon, TC in Troma's Chopper Chicks in Zombietown and Mary, a triple-breasted mutant prostitute in Paul Verhoeven's 1990 motion picture Total Recall. She also appeared in recurring episodes of St. Elsewhere, Hunter, General Hospital and The Young and the Restless.

Journalism
In recent years she has worked as an investigative reporter and journalist, writing for several newspapers and magazines, including Vogue, People and OK! magazines, as well as holding a lengthy staff position at the Miami Herald.

Lycia Naff interviewed the first of Bill Cosby's rape victims and survivors, actress Barbara Bowman.

Television appearances
{| class="wikitable"
|-
! Year !! Title !! Episode !! Role !! Notes
|-
| 1982 || Fame – "Metamorphosis" || Season 1, Episode 1 || Moira || Guest Star
|-
| 1983 || The Jeffersons – "I Do, I Don't" || Season 10, Episode 4 || Donna || Guest Star
|-
| 1984 || Masquerade – "Five Days" || Season 1, Episode 6 ||  || Guest Star
|-
| 1985 || St. Elsewhere – "Saving Face" || Season 3, Episode 16 || Maddy || Guest Star
|-
| 1985 || St. Elsewhere – "Give the Boy a Hand" || Season 3, Episode 17 || Maddy || Guest Star
|-
| 1985 || St. Elsewhere – "Any Portrait in a Storm" || Season 3, Episode 18 || Maddy || Guest Star
|-
| 1985 || Hunter – "The Snow Queen: Part 1" || Season 1, Episode 13 || Sally LaPone|| Guest Star
|-
| 1985 || Hunter – "The Snow Queen: Part 2" || Season 1, Episode 14 || Sally LaPone || Guest Star
|-
| 1985 || Hardcastle and McCormick – "Mirage a Trois" || Season 3, Episode 10 || Ali Casir || Guest Star
|-
| 1985 || Hell Town – "A Wedding in Hell Town" (a.k.a. "A Simple Wedding") || Season 1, Episode 12 || Kate || Guest Star
|-
| 1986 || Fame – "Judgement Day" || Season 3, Episode 13 || Susan || Guest Star
|-
| 1987 || Max Headroom – "The Blanks" || Season 1, Episode 6 || Jaxy || Guest Star
|-
| 1988 || The Equalizer – "The Child Broker" || Season 6, Episode 4 || Amy || Guest Star
|-
| 1988 || Duet – "Baby Talk" || Season 2, Episode 14 || Natalie || Guest Star
|-
| 1989 || Hard Time on Planet Earth – "Battle of the Sexes" || Season 1, Episode 6 || Connie Russo || Guest Star
|-
| 1989 || Star Trek: The Next Generation – "Q Who" || Season 2, Episode 16 || Ensign Sonya Gomez || Guest Star
|-
| 1989 || Star Trek: The Next Generation – "Samaritan Snare" || Season 2, Episode 17 || Ensign Sonya Gomez || Guest Star
|-
| 1989 || General Hospital'" || || Phoebe Dawson || 
|-
| 1990 || Baywatch (1989–1999) – "Home Cort" || Season 1, Episode 13 || Wanda || Guest Star
|-
| 1990 || The Flash – "Pilot" || Season 1, Episode 1 || Lila || Guest Star
|-
| 1990 || ABC Afterschool Special – "The Perfect Date" || Season 18, Episode 6 || Bernice Sherman || Lead actress
|-
| 1991 || Father Dowling Mysteries – "The Missing Witness Mystery" || Season 3, Episode 13 || Michele || Guest Star
|-
| 1991 || Shades of L.A. – "Cross the Center Line'|| Season 1, Episode 15 || Cherry || Guest Star
|-
| 1991 || Law & Order – "Asylum" || Season 2, Episode 4 || Mimi Sternhagen || Guest Star
|-
| 2007 || Without a Trace – "Connections" || Season 5, Episode 18 || Lynn Neyer || Guest Star
|-
| 2008 || Denise Richards: It's Complicated – "Denise vs. Tabloids" || Season 1, Episode 2 || Herself || 
|-
| 2008 || Redemption Song|| Season 1 || Herself || 
|-
| 2008 || Ghost Whisperer – "Pieces of You" || Season 4, Episode 9 || Butcher || Guest Star
|- 
| 2021 || Star Trek: Lower Decks – "First First Contact" || Season 2, Episode 10 || Captain Sonya Gomez || Guest Star
|}

Filmography

Awards and nominations
Awards nominations:
 1989: Daytime Emmy: Outstanding Performer in a Children's Special for the ABC Afterschool Special'' episode 'The Perfect Date'

References

External links
 
 

1962 births
American film actresses
American television actresses
American women journalists
American female dancers
20th-century American dancers
Living people
Actresses from Las Vegas
20th-century American actresses
21st-century American women